The 65th parallel south is a circle of latitude that is 65 degrees south of the Earth's equatorial plane. It crosses the Southern Ocean and Antarctica.

At this latitude the sun is visible for 22 hours, 02 minutes during the December solstice and 3 hours, 35 minutes during the June solstice.

Around the world
Starting at the Prime Meridian and heading eastwards, the parallel 65° south passes through:

{| class="wikitable plainrowheaders"
! scope="col" width="125" | Co-ordinates
! scope="col" | Continent or ocean
! scope="col" | Notes
|-
| style="background:#b0e0e6;" | 
! scope="row" style="background:#b0e0e6;" rowspan="4" | Southern Ocean
| style="background:#b0e0e6;" | South of the Atlantic Ocean
|-
| style="background:#b0e0e6;" | 
| style="background:#b0e0e6;" | South of the Indian Ocean
|-
| style="background:#b0e0e6;" | 
| style="background:#b0e0e6;" | South of the Pacific Ocean
|-
| style="background:#b0e0e6;" | 
| style="background:#b0e0e6;" | South of the Atlantic Ocean
|-
| 
! scope="row" | Antarctica
|-
| style="background:#b0e0e6;" | 
! scope="row" style="background:#b0e0e6;" | Southern Ocean
| style="background:#b0e0e6;" | South of the Atlantic Ocean
|}

See also
64th parallel south
66th parallel south

References

s65